The Banff Winter Carnival women's ice hockey tournament was an ice hockey tournament played in Banff, Alberta, Canada from 1917 to 1935. In the early years, it was contested to determine the women's ice hockey provincial champions of Alberta. In later years, the winners were awarded the Alpine Cup.

History
At the 1918 tournament, the Edmonton Monarchs held the distinction of being the only women's ice hockey team at the tournament to be coached by a woman.
The Fernie Swastikas played their last ever game in the 1926 Tournament.

List of winners
The following is a list of all the champions from the Banff Winter Carnival. The Banff Winter Carnival organizers were known to pay each team up to twenty-five percent of gate receipts to help cover team expenses. In later years, the Carnival would guarantee travel expenses for the competing teams.

References

Bibliography

Women's ice hockey competitions in Canada
Recurring events established in 1917
Recurring events disestablished in 1935
1917 establishments in Alberta
1935 disestablishments in Alberta
Banff, Alberta
Ice hockey competitions in Alberta
Ice hockey tournaments in Canada
Defunct ice hockey competitions in Canada
Defunct women's sports competitions